Mosaic is an album by Australian indie rock band Love of Diagrams. It was released in 2007 by Matador Records.

Track listing
"Form and Function"
"The Pyramid"
"Pace or the Patience"
"At 100%"
"Interlude"
"Ms v. Export"
"Confrontation"
"Single Cable"
"Double"
"All the Time"
"Trouble"
"What Was I Supposed to Do"
Unnamed Bonus Track

References

2007 albums
Love of Diagrams albums